This is an article about qualification for the 2017 Women's European Volleyball Championship.

Qualification summary

Pool standing procedure
 Number of matches won
 Match points
 Sets ratio
 Points ratio
 Result of the last match between the tied teams

Match won 3–0 or 3–1: 3 match points for the winner, 0 match points for the loser
Match won 3–2: 2 match points for the winner, 1 match point for the loser

Direct qualification
The host country team(s) and the best ranked teams in 2015 European Championship, total 7 teams, directly qualified for 2017 European Championship.

First round
First round was held 20–22 May 2016. 8 teams competed in two first round tournaments consisting of 4 teams. The top ranked teams of each pools and the best 2nd placed teams with the best score qualified for the second round.
Pools composition

All times are local.

Pool 1

Venue:  Audentes Sports Hall, Tallinn, Estonia

Pool 2

Venue:  Alytus Sports and Recreation centre, Alytus, Lithuania

Ranking of the 2nd placed teams

Second round
24 teams competed in the second round, where each pool of 4 teams played in 2 tournaments in 15–25 September 2016. The 1st placed teams of each pool qualified directly for the 2017 Championship. The 2nd placed teams of each pool qualified for the third round.
Pools composition

All times are local.

Pool A

Venue:  FSK Olymp, Yuzhne, Ukraine

Venue:  Palaterme, Montecatini Terme, Italy

Pool B

Venue:  Palais des Sports de Bordeaux, Bordeaux, France

Venue:  Lotto Arena, Antwerp, Belgium

Pool C

Venue:  Érd Aréna, Érd, Hungary

Venue:  BKS Stal Bielsko-Biała, Bielsko-Biała, Poland

Pool D

Venue:  Póvoa de Varzim Municipal Stadium, Póvoa de Varzim, Portugal

Venue:  Dvorana Gimnasium, Rovinj, Croatia

Pool E

Venue:  Hristo Botev stadium, Sofia, Bulgaria

Venue:  Polyvalent Hall, Piatra Neamț, Romania

Pool F

Venue:  Sportovní hala Vodova, Brno, Czech Republic

Venue:  Tabor Hall, Maribor, Slovenia

Third round
The 2nd placed teams of the second round will play one home and one away match to determine the 3 winners who will then subsequently be qualified through to the 2017 Championship. The third round matches will be held on 1–9 October 2016.

First leg

Second leg

References

External links
Official website

Women's European Volleyball Championships
European Volleyball Championships
Qualification for volleyball competitions
Volleyball
Volleyball